"Guérilla" is a song by Algerian rapper Soolking. It was released on 23 January 2018 as a single off his debut album Fruit du démon.

Background 
In an interview, Soolking said that he composed the song in a car with his friends.

Live performance 
In January 2018, Soolking performed Guérilla on Planète Rap on the French radio station Skyrock and was uploaded to YouTube.  The video garnered over 280 million views and it is Skyrock's most-viewed video.

Charts

Certifications

References 

2018 singles
Algerian songs
2018 songs